The Anthapura or Antahpura (Sanskrit ) was the royal harem of an Indian palace, the portion of king's palace where the queen and other court ladies stayed—the 'ladies' section' of the palace.

Normally, this portion of the palace would be accompanied with the Queen's Bath. Most of the palaces in India have anthapura as integral part (for example, Hampi and Mysore Palace).

See also
Women-only space

References

Architecture in India
Palaces in India
Indian culture
Women's culture
Harem